Nova Odessa (lit., New Odessa) is a Brazilian municipality in the state of São Paulo. It is part of the Metropolitan Region of Campinas. The population is 60,956 (2020 est.) in an area of 73.79 km². Nova Odessa was founded on May 24, 1905, by Carlos José de Arruda Botelho, Secretary of Agriculture of the state of São Paulo, and then settled by Ukrainians and Latvians.

Its name is due to a visit Carlos Botelho made to the city of Odessa, Ukraine, from where he brought the style of its streets, and not because the first settlers were from there (as they were not).

History 

In the early 20th century, the area of present-day Nova Odessa was classified as an uninhabited land suitable for farming. On May 24, 1905, the Brazilian government founded Nova Odessa as a "Núcleo Colonial" (the "Colonial Nuclei" were agricultural areas to where the Brazilian government wished to attract European immigrants in large-scale).

The first settlers to arrive in the area were immigrants from Ukraine, but, not adapting to agriculture (one of the pointed reasons for this is that they were not farmers originally), most of them soon abandoned the colony and moved to larger Brazilian cities. In late 1905, only a few Ukrainian families had remained in the nucleus. Determined to consolidate the colony, the Brazilian government sent João Gutmann to Riga, capital of Latvia, with the goal of attracting farmers to the colony. In 1906, the place received the first settlers from Latvia, that were the responsible for the consolidation of the colony. Later, other Brazilian immigration agents were sent to Latvia and succeeded in attracting more families.

Culture 
The city maintains or supports directly in several ways a wide range of departments, programs, groups and cultural institutions. Those include the Municipal Public Library (Biblioteca Pública Municipal Professor Antônio Fernandes Gonçalves) —that has a section of books in the Latvian language. Although the city later received many people from other ethnicities, the Latvian Culture is still very noticeable and there are plans for the creation of a Center of Latvian Culture (Centro de Cultura Leta) there.

Economy 
The economy is based on industry, mainly textiles. The city's GDP went from R$373 million in 1999 to R$1.6 billion in 2009. With its per capita value reaching R$32,862 (2009 data) —double the national average.

Climate 
The city has a highland tropical climate, semi-humid with dry winters.

References

External links 

Populated places established in 1905
1905 establishments in Brazil
Municipalities in São Paulo (state)